Midnight Choir was a Norwegian alternative rock/alt-country band active from 1992 to 2004.

Biography 
The members of Midnight Choir were Al DeLoner (Atle Bystrøm 'Olsen'), Paal Flaata, and Ron 'Bystrøm' Olsen. (Atle and Ron are brothers)

The band played a kind of Americana music and was named after the opening of Leonard Cohen's song "Bird on a Wire": "Like a bird on a wire, like a drunk in a midnight choir."

Honors 
1998: Spellemannprisen in the category best Rock band, for the album Amsterdam Stranded

Discography (albums) 
1994: Midnight Choir
1996: Olsen's Lot
1998: Amsterdam Stranded
2000: Unsung Heroine
2002: Selected (compilation)
2003: Waiting for the Bricks to Fall
2005: All Tomorrows Tears: The Best of Midnight Choir (compilation)

From Olsen's Lot and onward produced by Chris Eckman (of The Walkabouts).

On the album Unsung Heroine, Chris Eckman is part of the band. There is also an appearance by Nils Petter Molvær on trumpet.

Discography (DVD)
2008:  In the Shadow of the Circus Live recording Rockefeller Oslo mars 2003

External links

Norwegian rock music groups
Musical groups established in 1992
1992 establishments in Norway
Musical groups disestablished in 2004
2004 disestablishments in Norway
Glitterhouse Records artists